The Life of Verdi is a 1982 Italian-language biographical television miniseries directed by Renato Castellani dramatizing the life of Italian composer Giuseppe Verdi. Castellani also co-wrote the original script with Leonardo Benvenuti and Piero De Bernardi. The English version was written by Gene Luotto and narrated by Burt Lancaster. The miniseries first aired in 1982, and was made available on DVD in 2003.

The production stars British actor Ronald Pickup as Giuseppe Verdi, Italian ballet dancer and actress Carla Fracci as Giuseppina Verdi, and Giampiero Albertini as Antonio Barezzi. Funded by a number of European national broadcasting companies, the series is an accurate portrayal of Verdi's life.

According to promotional material for the production, it was "filmed on location in Italy, Leningrad, London, and Paris...(T)his epic mini-series took several years to create, requiring more than 100 actors, 1800 extras, and 4000 costumes."

Episodes
The English version has seven 90-minute episodes totaling 630 minutes; the original Italian version, nine 70-minute episodes.
 "Childhood, Barezzi & Milan" 
 "Margherita, Tragedy & Nabucco"
 "Patriotism, I Lombardi & Ernani"
 "Giuseppina, Revolution & Rigoletto"
 "Independent Italy, La Traviata & Un Ballo"
 "Wagner, Teresa & Aida"
 "Crisis, Otello & Falstaff"

Cast

 Ronald Pickup as Giuseppe Verdi
 Omero Antonutti as Carlo Verdi
 Agla Marsili as Luisa Uttini
 Giampiero Albertini as Antonio Barezzi
 Adriana Innocenti as Maria Barezzi
 Daria Nicolodi as Margherita Barezzi
 Carla Fracci as Giuseppina Strepponi
 Lino Capolicchio as Arrigo Boito
 Enzo Cerusico as Emanuele Muzio
 Eva Christian as Teresa Stolz
 Nino Dal Fabbro as Giulio Ricordi
 Jan Niklas as Angelo Mariani
 Renzo Palmer as Camillo Benso, Count of Cavour
 Raimondo Penne as Francesco Maria Piave
 Tito Schipa Jr. as Franco Faccio
 Nanni Svampa as Impresario Merelli
 Milena Vukotic as Clara Maffei
 Ugo Bologna as Gaetano Donizetti
 Giorgio Trestini as Temistocle Solera
 Leopoldo Trieste as Finola
 Carlo Colombo as Giovannino Barezzi

References

External links

1982 television films
1982 films
Italian biographical films
Italian television films
Films about classical music and musicians
Films about composers
Films directed by Renato Castellani
Cultural depictions of Giuseppe Verdi
Television series set in the 19th century
Films set in the Kingdom of Lombardy–Venetia
1980s Italian films